The Tomb of Rais al-Mojahedin is a late Qajar era mausoleum belonging to the Iranian revolutionary Rais al-Mojahedin.

The building was listed among the national heritage sites of Iran with the registration number 7683 on 8 March 2003.

References 

Mausoleums in Iran
Tombs in Iran